The telluride ion is the anion Te2− and its derivatives. It is analogous to the other chalcogenide anions, the lighter O2−, S2−, and Se2−, and the heavier Po2−.

In principle, Te2− is formed by the two-e− reduction of tellurium. The redox potential is −1.14 V.
Te(s) + 2 e− ↔ Te2−
Although solutions of the telluride dianion have not been reported, soluble salts of bitelluride (TeH−) are known.

Organic tellurides
Tellurides also describe a class of organotellurium compounds formally derived from Te2−.  An illustrative member is dimethyl telluride, which results from the methylation of telluride salts:
2 CH3I  +  Na2Te   →  (CH3)2Te  +  2 NaI
Dimethyl telluride is formed by the body when tellurium is ingested. Such compounds are often called telluroethers because they are structurally related to ethers with tellurium replacing oxygen, although the length of the C–Te bond is much longer than a C–O bond. C–Te–C angles tend to be closer to 90°.

Inorganic tellurides
Many metal tellurides are known, including some telluride minerals. These include natural gold tellurides, like calaverite and krennerite (AuTe2), and sylvanite (AgAuTe4). They are minor ores of gold, although they comprise the major naturally occurring compounds of gold. (A few other natural compounds of gold, such as the bismuthide maldonite (Au2Bi) and antimonide aurostibite (AuSb2), are known). Although the bonding in such materials is often fairly covalent, they are described casually as salts of Te2−. Using this approach, Ag2Te is derived from Ag+ and Te2−.  Catenated Te anions are known in the form of the polytellurides. They arise by the reaction of telluride dianion with elemental Te:
Te2-  +  n Te  →  Ten+12-

Applications
Tellurides have no large scale applications. Cadmium telluride has attractive photovoltaic properties.  Both bismuth telluride and lead telluride are exceptional thermoelectric materials.  Some of these thermoelectric materials have been commercialized.

References

Anions